Somsili (also Romanized as Somsīlī; also known as Somsarī) is a village in Bondar Rural District, Senderk District, Minab County, Hormozgan Province, Iran. At the 2006 census, its population was 144, in 29 families.

References 

Populated places in Minab County